Schoenus variicellae is a species of sedge, first described in 1997 by Barbara Rye. It is native to Western Australia.

It is an annual sedge growing from 2 cm to 16 cm high in damp situations on clay or sandy clay and is found on granite outcrops. It flowers from August to November.

References

External links
 Schoenus variicellae occurrence data from GBIF

variicellae
Plants described in 1810
Flora of New South Wales
Flora of Queensland